False saber-toothed cat may refer to:
 Nimravidae, an extinct family of cat-like carnivorans
 Barbourofelidae, an extinct family of carnivorans possibly related to true cats

See also
Saber-toothed cat, members of Machairodontinae
Saber-toothed predator, various extinct groups of predators with saber-teeth